Arctagyrta is a monotypic moth genus in the family Erebidae erected by George Hampson in 1901. Its single species, Arctagyrta nana, was first described by Francis Walker in 1856. It is found in the Brazilian state of Amazonas.

References

Phaegopterina
Monotypic moth genera
Moths described in 1856
Moths of South America